Wicked Monsters BLAST!  is a rail shooter game for the Nintendo Wii and PlayStation 3. It was developed by Thai based studio Corecell Technology.

Controls
The Wii version uses the Wiimote controller, while the PS3 version uses either the PlayStation Move controller or a DualShock 3 controller.

Gameplay
the game is similar to Point Blank (video game series) where you have multiple challenges.

External links
Official website

References

2011 video games
Platform games
Side-scrolling video games
Action-adventure games
Wii games
PlayStation 3 games
PlayStation Move-compatible games
Video games developed in Thailand
Valcon Games games